Christina Seilern is a Swiss-Austrian architect. She won the 2013 Royal Institute of British Architects (RIBA) International Prize for architecture and the 2013 RIBA International Award for House of the Year. She established London-based Studio Seilern Architects (SSA)  in 2006.

Early life
Seilern attended school in Switzerland. She studied architecture at the Wellesley College as an undergraduate and attended Columbia University for her master's degree.

Seilern began working for Rafael Viñoly at Rafael Viñoly Architects in 1997.

Career
Seilern is the founder and lead architect at Studio Seilern Architects in London. Seilern claims that the buildings of Louis Khan and Eero Saarinen inspired her work.

G.W. Annenberg Performing Arts Centre
Seilern designed the G. W. Annenberg Performing Arts Centre at Wellington College in Berkshire. Seilern's design placed a circular base at the foot of the auditorium so that the venue appears to emerge from the campus' woodland. Seilern claims Greek amphitheatres inspired the main auditorium's circular shape. Seilern clad the venue's exterior with charred timber using the shou sugi ban technique.

The centre won the 2018 World Architecture Festival award for Best Building in Education  and RIBA shortlisted the building for their 2019 South Award.

The ski resort in Andermatt
Samih Sawiris commissioned Seilern's studio to design Andermatt Concert Hall and two restaurants. The concert hall was the first development stage in the Swiss cultural complex.

The venue seats a maximum of six hundred and fifty people and can accommodate a philharmonic orchestra. The conductor Constantinos Carydis led a performance by the  Berlin Philharmonic during the venue's opening evening. The Daily Telegraph claims that the concert hall is the first purpose-built auditorium in any Alpine ski resort.

Seilern's design featured a concrete foundation supporting a glued laminated timber structure. Seilern designed the restaurants to resemble Swiss Alpine settlements.

Other work
Seilern and architect Muzia Sforza  designed the Gota Dam residence. The 1500 square metre residential property sits on top of a large rock in Zimbabwe. The project won the 2013 RIBA International Award for House of the Year.

Seilern's company designed Andsell Street, a commercial development in Kensington, London. RIBA shortlisted the project for their 2017 RIBA London Regional Award.

References

Women architects
Swiss architects
Year of birth missing (living people)
Living people